Halla Signý Kristjánsdóttir (born 1 May 1964) is an Icelandic politician who is a member of the Althing (Iceland's parliament) for the Northwest Constituency since 2017.

References

External links 

 Biography of Halla Signý Kristjánsdóttir on the parliament website (Icelandic)

Kristjansdottir, Halla Signy
Kristjansdottir, Halla Signy
Icelandic women in politics
Kristjansdottir, Halla Signy
Members of the Althing
Progressive Party (Iceland) politicians
Bifröst University alumni